Bachman Branch (also Bachman Creek) is the name of a medium-sized tributary of the Trinity River with headwaters in northwest Dallas, Texas (USA). The tributary is 10 miles (16 km) in length and rises at Forest Lane, 0.5 miles (0.8 km) west of the Dallas North Tollway. It runs south and then west through Bachman Lake and ultimately into the Elm Fork of the Trinity River. The Branch is dammed with the New Frazier dam to provide water to Fishing Hole Lake. New Frasier Dam is on the Elm Fork Of Trinity River in Dallas County, Texas and is used for flood control purposes. Construction was completed in 1965. It is owned by the Dallas Water Utilities  New Frasier Dam is a gravity dam. Its height is 16 feet with a length of 180 feet. Normal storage is 

Headwaters: 

Mouth:

See also
List of rivers of Texas

References

External links 

Rivers of Dallas
Trinity River (Texas)
Rivers of Dallas County, Texas